Łysaków may refer to the following places:
Łysaków, Lublin Voivodeship (east Poland)
Łysaków, Mielec County in Subcarpathian Voivodeship (south-east Poland)
Łysaków, Stalowa Wola County in Subcarpathian Voivodeship (south-east Poland)
Łysaków, Silesian Voivodeship (south Poland)